The 1904 Army Cadets football team represented the United States Military Academy in the 1904 college football season. In their first season under head coach Robert Boyers, the Cadets compiled a  record, shut out five of their nine opponents, and outscored all opponents by a combined total of 136 to 27.  The team's two losses were to Harvard and Princeton. In the annual Army–Navy Game, the Cadets defeated the Midshipmen 

Five members of the squad were honored by one or both of Walter Camp (WC) and Caspar Whitney (CW) on the All-America team. They are: center Arthur Tipton (WC-1, CW-1); back Henry Torney (CW-1); end Alexander Garfield Gillespie (WC-2); halfback Frederick Prince (CW-2); and tackle Thomas Doe (WC-3).

Schedule

References

Army
Army Black Knights football seasons
Army Cadets football